Giovanni D'Aleo (born 1 July 1959 in Palermo) is a retired male long-distance runner from Italy, who won silver medal in the marathon at the 1983 Summer Universiade.

Biography
He competed for his native country at the 1984 Summer Olympics in Los Angeles, California, finishing in 35th place. D'Aleo set his personal best (2:15.07) in the men's marathon in 1984.

Achievements

References

External links
 

1959 births
Living people
Italian male long-distance runners
Athletes (track and field) at the 1984 Summer Olympics
Olympic athletes of Italy
Sportspeople from Palermo
Universiade medalists in athletics (track and field)
Universiade silver medalists for Italy